Shine is the debut EP by the American rock band Mother Love Bone. It was released on March 20, 1989 through Stardog/Mercury Records. This was the only compilation of recordings to be released during singer,  Andrew Wood's lifetime.

Overview
The EP was recorded in November 1988 at London Bridge Studios in Seattle, Washington with producer Mark Dearnley. Dearnley also mixed the album, Charles Peterson photographed the cover art. With the exception of the over eight minute long "Chloe Dancer/Crown of Thorns", a majority of the songs here draw upon the band's rawer side. Vocalist Andrew Wood's dreamy lyrics are sung in a tenor heavily reminiscent of Led Zeppelin frontman Robert Plant. Mother Love Bone became the first of the new crop of Seattle bands to have a release on a major label. The record sold well and rapidly increased the hype surrounding the band. John Book of Allmusic said the "record contributed to the buzz about the Seattle music scene." This whole release was later reissued on the Mother Love Bone (also known as Stardog Champion) compilation album in 1992, with the exception of the hidden track "Zanzibar" which can only be found on this EP.

Track listing

CD bonus track

I "Capricorn Sister" contains the hidden track "Zanzibar" at 4:07.

Personnel
Mother Love Bone
Andrew Wood – lead vocals, piano
Bruce Fairweather – lead guitar
Stone Gossard – rhythm guitar
Jeff Ament – bass
Greg Gilmore – drums

Production
Michael Bays – art direction
Mark Dearnley – production, mixing
Klotz – design
Charles Peterson – photography

References

1989 debut EPs
Mother Love Bone albums
Grunge EPs
Mercury Records EPs